Stuart Laing may refer to:

 Stuart Laing (actor) (born 1969), London 
 Stuart Laing (diplomat) (born 1948), British diplomat